Lake Zrewar , also known as Zrewar or Zrewar (Kurdish: Zrêbar or Zrêwar, زرێبار), ( Zarivār), is a lake in the Zagros Mountains, within Kurdistan Province of western Iran.

Etymology
its name is composed of zrê ("sea") and the suffix -bar (which in Kurdish means "lake").

Situation

Zeribar Lake is a major touristic attraction in the region. There is a great deal of folklore about the origins of this lake amongst the Kurdish people of the area.

Gallery

References

External links
Zarivar Online Photo Galley

Zeribar, Lake
Landforms of Kurdistan Province
Iranian Kurdistan
Tourist attractions in Kurdistan Province